Phoebophilus is a genus of moths of the family Noctuidae.

Species
 Phoebophilus amoenus Staudinger, 1888
 Phoebophilus dolius Püngeler, 1902
 Phoebophilus veternosa (Püngeler, 1907)

References
Natural History Museum Lepidoptera genus database
Phoebophilus at funet

Hadeninae